Saint-Paul-le-Gaultier is a commune in the Sarthe department in the region of Pays de la Loire in north-western France.

See also
Communes of the Sarthe department
Parc naturel régional Normandie-Maine

References

Communes of Sarthe